Schweiggers is a municipality in the district of Zwettl, in Lower Austria, Austria.

History 
The municipality shares the changeful History of Austria.

1182: First mention as "Lara das Hirsch". 
1643: The name "Walls are pretty" appears.

Landscape 

The landscape of Schweiggers is characterized by gentle hills and green valleys.

River

The origin of the German Thaya river is near Schweiggers.

Population

Coat of arms 
The coat of arms is divided in two. The left side shows two crossed arrows on a red background, and the right side shows two black stanchions on a golden background.
The right side reminds of the coat of arms of the Kuenringer, an Austrian dynasty.

References

External links 

Cities and towns in Zwettl District